William Samuel Verplanck Junior (January 16, 1916 in Plainfield, New Jersey – September 30, 2002 in Knoxville, Tennessee) was an American psychologist. He conducted a series of significant experiments in the fields of ethology, experimental psychology, and especially in the field of radical behaviorism.

Written works
Verplanck, W.S. (1942) The development of discrimination in a simple locomotor habit. Journal of Experimental Psychology, 31, 441–464.
Berry, R.N., Verplanck, W.S., and Graham, C.H. (1943) The reversal of discrimination in a simple running habit. Journal of Experimental Psychology, 32, 325–334.
Verplanck, W.S. (1946) The effects of paredrine on night vision test performance. (Bur. Med. Surg., 1944; Publ. Bd., N. 23049) Washington, D.C.: U.S. Dept. Commerce, 14.
Verplanck, W.S. (1946) Comparative study of adaptometers. (Bur. Med. Surg., 1942, Publ. Bd. No. 23050) Washington, D.C.: U.S. Dept. Commerce, 34.
Verplanck, W.S. (1946) Night vision testing on members of crew of the U.S.S. New Jersey (Bur. Med. Surg., 1943; Publ. Bd. No. 23072) Washington, D.C.: U.S. Dept. Commerce, 9.

References
5. http://verplanck.interconductual.com/

20th-century American psychologists
1916 births
2002 deaths